"Living in America" is a 1985 song composed by Dan Hartman and Charlie Midnight and performed by James Brown. It was released as a single in 1985 and reached number 4 on the Billboard Hot 100 chart. The song entered the Billboard Top 40 on January 11, 1986, and remained on the chart for 11 weeks. It also became a top five hit in the United Kingdom, peaking at number 5 on the UK Singles Chart; it was his only top 10 single in the UK. It was his first Top 40 hit in ten years on the US pop charts, and it would also be his last. In 1987, it was nominated for a Grammy Award for Best R&B Song and won Brown a Grammy Award for Best Male R&B Vocal Performance.

Legacy
The song was prominently featured in the film Rocky IV. In the film, Brown sings the song during Apollo Creed’s ring entrance, in reference to the character's patriotic image. It appeared on the Rocky IV soundtrack album. A modified version of the song was used in the film Coming to America with the chorus's lyrics changed to match the film's title. 

The song's co-writer Dan Hartman later included his recording of the song on his 1994 album Keep the Fire Burnin'.

Personnel
Credits adapted from the album Gravity.
James Brown – lead vocals
Stevie Ray Vaughan – lead guitar
Dan Hartman – guitar, keyboards, backing vocals
T. M. Stevens – bass, backing vocals
Ray Marchica – drums
The Uptown Horns (Arno Hecht, Bob Funk, Crispin Cioe, "Hollywood" Paul Litteral) – horns

Chart performance

Weekly charts

Year-end charts

Track listings
12" release
A. Living in America (R & B Dance Version) – 6:30 	
B1. Living in America (Instrumental) – 4:33 	
B2. Living in America (LP Version) – 4:42 	

7" release
A. Living in America – 4:08
B. Farewell (Vince DiCola) – 2:58

Parody
"Weird Al" Yankovic parodied the song on his 1986 album Polka Party! in a song entitled "Living with a Hernia", describing various kinds of hernias where Brown originally listed several American cities. The parody ends with Al shouting "I feel bad!" instead of Brown's trademark "I feel good!" The music video was shot on the same set Brown performed on in Rocky IV. Paul Shanklin also parodied "Living in America" on his 1999 album Bill Clinton: The Comeback Kid Tour in a song entitled "Sneaking in America", as a reference to illegal immigration to America. The song was also parodied in TV advertisements for the TV series Daisy Does America, substituting the show's title for the song's.

References

External links
Review at AllMusic

Film theme songs
1985 singles
1986 singles
American patriotic songs
Dan Hartman songs
James Brown songs
Songs from Rocky (film series)
Songs written by Charlie Midnight
Songs written by Dan Hartman
Song recordings produced by Dan Hartman
Songs about the United States
Scotti Brothers Records singles